Bragino is a rural locality (a village) in Gorod Vyazniki, Vyaznikovsky District, Vladimir Oblast, Russia. The population was 5 as of 2010.

Geography 
Bragino is located on the Klyazma River, 13 km east of Vyazniki (the district's administrative centre) by road. Rudilnitsy is the nearest rural locality.

References 

Rural localities in Vyaznikovsky District